Laevisoolithidae is an oofamily of fossil eggs belonging to the Ornithoid-ratite morphotype. Their eggshells are smooth and very thin, typically less than a millimeter thick. Laevisoolithids may be the eggs of Enantiornithid birds. Eggs of the family were found in the Grès à Reptiles Formation of France and the Nemegt Formation of Mongolia.

References 

Egg fossils